Cheryl Abplanalp Thompson (born June 1, 1972) is an American handball player. She competed in the 1996 Summer Olympics.

Early life and education 
Abplanalp was born in Bryn Mawr, Pennsylvania. She played field hockey, basketball and softball at Great Valley High School in eastern Chester County, Pennsylvania. She was a three-sport athlete at Davis and Elkins College and co-captain of the field hockey, basketball and softball teams. She was named Davis And Elkins College Athlete of the year in 1993-'94. She graduated from Davis and Elkins in 1994.

Career
Abplanalp began playing team handball and became the youngest player for Team USA at the 1996 Summer Olympics in Atlanta. In 2001, she was inducted into the Davis and Elkins College Hall of Fame.

Personal life
Abplanalp married John Thompson and they have one daughter together.

References

1972 births
Living people
Handball players at the 1996 Summer Olympics
American female handball players
Olympic handball players of the United States
People from Bryn Mawr, Pennsylvania
Davis & Elkins Senators women's basketball players
Davis & Elkins Senators softball players
Davis & Elkins Senators field hockey players